The Serpent River First Nation, a signatory to the Robinson Huron Treaty of 1850, is an Anishinaabe First Nation in the Canadian province of Ontario, located midway between Sault Ste. Marie and Sudbury along the North Channel of Lake Huron.

The First Nation's provisional territory extends from this waters of the North Channel of Lake Huron, Serpent River Basin; north beyond the city of Elliot Lake. The Serpent River nation has a provisional land base of 5250 square kilometers. It occupies the Serpent River 7 reserve.

Notable members
Bonnie Devine, conceptual artist, curator, filmmaker, and author
Jesse Wente, film critic, radio personality, curator

References

External links
Serpent River First Nation, official website
First Nation profile
Serpent River CBC Profile

Ojibwe governments
First Nations governments in Ontario
Anishinaabe reserves in Ontario
Communities in Algoma District